East-West Records was a jazz record label which released four albums from 1956 to 1958 featuring a combination of American and Swedish jazz musicians.

East-West was a division of Atlantic Records. The small catalog was produced by Nesuhi Ertegun.

Lars Gullin's Swings was reissued in 1999 on Collectables Records, paired with his 1956 album Baritone Sax.

Discography

References

Jazz record labels